Carabus pedemontanus maurinensis is a subspecies of black-coloured beetle from family Carabidae, that is endemic to France.

References

pedemontanus maurinensis
Beetles described in 2002
Endemic beetles of Metropolitan France